Siegfried is a heavy metal band from Austria that was founded in 1998 by Bruder Cle, aka Hagen, who was later joined by Daniel Bachmaier (ex Sarcasm Syndrome), a.k.a. Ortwin, and former Dreams of Sanity singer Sandra Schleret. In 2000 they released a demo CD called Fafnir. Later in 2000 they were signed to Napalm Records, releasing their first album, Drachenherz, in 2001. Their second album, Eisenwinter, was released in 2003. The lyrics of Siegfried are based on and inspired by the Nibelung Saga.

According to Sandra Schleret as of April 25, 2008, "Siegfried is still together and working on a new album (pre-production is finished except the vocals for two songs.)"

In May 2009 Siegfried recorded their third album, Nibelung, in Alex Krull's well-known Mastersound studios. Nibelung was released in November 2009.

Line-up 
 Sandra Schleret – Female vocals
 Werner Bialek – Epic Male vocals
 Bruder Cle – Harsh Male vocals
 Daniel Bachmaier – Guitar and keyboards
 Roland Wurzer – Bass 
 Hannes Krause – Keyboards
 Moritz Neuner – Drums

Discography 
 Fafnir demo (2000)
 Drachenherz (2001)
 Eisenwinter (2003)
 Nibelung (2009)

External links
Official website
Encyclopedia Metallum
Siegfried at Napalm Records
Sandra Schleret official homepage

References

Austrian heavy metal musical groups